Tuff Turf is a 1985 American drama film directed by Fritz Kiersch and starring James Spader and Kim Richards. The film was released in the United States on January 11, 1985.

Plot
Morgan Hiller (Spader) is an intelligent but bullied teenager from Connecticut who relocates to Los Angeles with his strict mother and his father after his father's business goes under. Morgan befriends Jimmy Parker (Downey) but struggles to make other friends. Trouble ensues when Morgan pursues bad girl Frankie Croyden (Richards), whose sociopathic and psychopathic boyfriend Nick Hauser (Paul Mones) is the leader of a local gang who had a run in with Morgan during an attempted mugging of a businessman. Morgan soon finds pursuing Frankie comes with harsh consequences. Morgan learns some valuable, harsh and hard lessons, and finds out how far he is really willing to go for Frankie. Ultimately, Morgan must face and fight Nick and his gang to test the bounds of his honor, and his love for Frankie.

Cast

Soundtrack
 "Tuff Turf" - Southside Johnny
 "People Who Died" - the Jim Carroll Band
 "Green Onions" - Jack Mack and the Heart Attack
 "Voices" - The Jim Carroll Band
 "So Tuff" - Jack Mack and the Heart Attack
 "Breakin' the Rules (What Do You Do When Opposites Attract)" - Lene Lovich
 "Love Hates" - Marianne Faithfull
 "It's Too Late" - The Jim Carroll Band
 "She's Looking Good" - Jack Mack and the Heart Attack
 "Twist and Shout" - Dale Gonyea with J.R. & the Z-Men
 "We Walk the Night" - Paul Carney dubbed singing voice for James Spader
 "Breakin' the Rules" - Jonathan Elias (1985 VHS/Beta Home Video Version only)

Liner notes from 1985 LP: 
Mastered At– Precision Lacquer, Hollywood CA 
Coordinator– Harold Bronson 
Design– Grace Amemiya 
Mastered By– Stephen Marcussen

References

External links
 
 
 

1985 films
1980s teen drama films
American teen drama films
Films set in Los Angeles
Films shot in Los Angeles
Films scored by Jonathan Elias
Hood films
New World Pictures films
Teensploitation
Films directed by Fritz Kiersch
1985 drama films
1980s English-language films
1980s American films